Sinilabeo longirostris is a species of cyprinid of the genus Sinilabeo. It inhabits Vietnam and is considered harmless to humans. It has not been evaluated on the IUCN Red List.

References

Cyprinid fish of Asia
Fish described in 2001
Fish of Vietnam